Vasquez Pass, elevation , is a mountain pass that crosses the Continental Divide in the Front Range of the Rocky Mountains of Colorado in the United States.

See also

Southern Rocky Mountains
Front Range
Colorado mountain passes

References

Landforms of Clear Creek County, Colorado
Landforms of Grand County, Colorado
Mountain passes of Colorado
Great Divide of North America